RT1 or RT-1 may refer to:

 RT-1, an intercontinental ballistic missile design
 RT1 (Rodalies de Catalunya), a commuter rail line
 RT1, an electric car prototype developed by Seattle City Light

See also
 RT (disambiguation)
 Rivian R1T, an electric pick-up truck
 TR1 (disambiguation)